Skilling may refer to:
Places
Skilling, Dorset, England
 Skilling Island, Antarctica
People
 Chauncey Fitch Skilling (1868-1945), American architect
 H. Gordon Skilling (1912-2001), Canadian political scientist
 Jeffrey Skilling (born 1953), American former CEO of Enron Corporation, brother of Tom Skilling
 John Skilling (1921–1998), American civil engineer and architect
 Mark Skilling (born 1972), Scottish footballer
 Tom Skilling (born 1952), American meteorologist in Chicago, Illinois, brother of Jeffrey Skilling

Other
 Skilling (Scandinavian monetary unit), a historical form of currency
 Skilling v. United States, a U.S. Supreme Court case

See also
Skillings

English-language surnames